Antitrust Act can refer to:
The Sherman Antitrust Act, first United States federal government action to limit monopolies
Sherman Antitrust Act (federal preemption)
The Clayton Antitrust Act, enacted to remedy deficiencies in antitrust law created under the Sherman Antitrust Act
Hart–Scott–Rodino Antitrust Improvements Act
Tunney Act, officially known as the Antitrust Procedures and Penalties Act

See also
United States antitrust law